Vauter's Church, also known as Vauter's Episcopal Church, is a historic Episcopal church located at Loretto, Essex County, Virginia. It was built in 1719, and is a one-story, "T" shaped brick building with a gable roof. The south wing was added in 1731. Vauter's is the upper Church of St. Anne's Parish.

It was listed on the National Register of Historic Places in 1972.

References

External links
Vauter's Episcopal Church, U.S. Route 17, Loretto, Essex County, VA: 1 photo and 2 data pages at Historic American Buildings Survey

Historic American Buildings Survey in Virginia
Churches on the National Register of Historic Places in Virginia
National Register of Historic Places in Essex County, Virginia
Churches completed in 1719
Episcopal churches in Virginia
Buildings and structures in Essex County, Virginia
18th-century Episcopal church buildings
1719 establishments in the Thirteen Colonies